Václav Halama (also Wenzel Halama, (4 November 1940 – 8 June 2017) was a Czech footballer and coach.

References

1940 births
2017 deaths
Czech footballers
Sportspeople from Jablonec nad Nisou
Association football goalkeepers
Czech football managers
Grazer AK managers
TSV 1860 Munich managers
FK Austria Wien managers
AEK Athens F.C. managers
FC Locarno managers
FK Jablonec players